Gonzalo Alejandro Crettaz (born 28 February 2000), sometimes known simply as Gonzalo, is an Argentine footballer who plays for Spanish club UD Logroñés as a goalkeeper.

Club career
Born in Buenos Aires, Crettaz moved to Spain at early age and joined Málaga CF's youth setup in 2017, from Levante UD. He made his senior debut with the reserves on 25 August 2019, starting in a 4–0 Tercera División away routing of Alhaurín de la Torre CF.

On 16 November 2019, as Munir was out on international duty, Crettaz made his first team debut by playing the full 90 minutes of a 0–1 loss at AD Alcorcón in the Segunda División championship. On 17 August 2021, after being mainly a third-choice option in the main squad, he was loaned to Primera División RFEF side CD Badajoz, for one year.

References

External links
 
 
 

2000 births
Living people
Argentine people of Swiss descent
Footballers from Buenos Aires
Argentine footballers
Spanish footballers
Association football goalkeepers
Segunda División players
Primera Federación players
Tercera División players
Atlético Malagueño players
Málaga CF players
CD Badajoz players
UD Logroñés players